The Resistance (La Resistencia) is a Spanish TV talk show that is broadcast in #0 of Movistar +. Its first edition was on 1 February 2018, hosted by David Broncano broadcast from the Arlequín Theater in Madrid and is produced by El Terrat.

History 
Coinciding with the second anniversary of channel #0, David Broncano left his usual collaboration in the Late Motiv program and the Locomundo program to present the first late late show in Spain, following the format of some television channels in the United States of linking two nightly shows (in Spanish, the program of the end of the night) in a row. The program is broadcast from the Arlequín Theater, very close to Madrid's Gran Vía and with a live audience.

The irreverent interviews he does in this program have become, in many occasions, viral. The host personality has also helped him win the sympathy of a large audience. As a consequence, the TV show has had great success both on the Movistar + channel and on the YouTube page.  

The program is directed by Ricardo Castella, who also acts as a prompter. It has as collaborators with Dani Rovira, Antonio Resines, Ignatius Farray, Quequé, Jorge Ponce, Ernesto Sevilla or Rober Bodegas among others and in the first programs appeared youtuber Ter. Beatboxer Marcos Martínez «Grison» and Ricardo Castella perform the music live.

The song "Hail to the Chief" from the supergroup Prophets of Rage was chosen for the title sequence. In 2019, the show received the Ondas Award for Best Television Entertainment Program.

Sections 

 Previous show

Daily section that can only be seen by those attending the program at the Arlequín Theater, since it is not broadcast on the televised program. In this part, the audience is entertained with the performance of Jaime Caravaca, resident comedian and Grison Beatbox.

 Insults of the public

Daily section of the presenter David Broncano where he receives insults from the public through social networks and comments on them.

 Monologues

Daily and initial section presented by David Broncano in which he reviews current affairs in a humorous way, especially the most absurd and surreal news on the scene. Despite having a humorous and casual tone, its most critical side has also been applauded with some of the political and social situations of the moment.

 Interview

Program space in which David Broncano interviews a guest, a group or some formation. The guests tend to have a lesser presence in the media than those of other programs on the same network, which allows to discover characters that until now had carried out a few or any interviews. The star question that David Broncano always asks is "How much money do you have?", along with the question of "When was the last time you had sex?". Many guests respond and others prefer not to respond and keep the mystery.

The program has often been applauded because of the great visibility it gives to women's sports in the country by very often inviting athletes who do not have the opportunity to attend other programs to do their promotion.

Who would you rather see dead?

Jorge Ponce shows two photographs of two different celebrities and asks the audience a question: who would you prefer see dead. He presents arguments in favor of each famous and finally it is the public who makes the decision; the most applauded is the one that they prefer to die. Santiago Segura, Joaquín Sabina or Andrés Iniesta are some of the celebrities who have starred in this section, and even Jesús de Nazaret and Barrabás appeared in an edition for Holy Week.

 Live connexions from the street

From outside the Arlequín Theater, on Madrid's Gran Vía, Jorge Ponce connects with the set and conducts brief interviews with pedestrians. The most frequent ones consist of judging passers-by by their appearance and interviewing them based on the prejudices they generate. He also asks questions about a specific date or event. The connections until March were broadcast in near live, due to the change of time and daylight hours. Jorge Ponce discovered that they were recorded in the afternoon.

 Review of internet forums

Jorge Ponce investigates the most surreal forums on the internet, looking for the most original and strange answers from Internet users.

 Musical performance

Ignatius Farray, together with his friend José Luis Petróleo, form a group and perform a chaotic musical performance. Before singing, he presents and comments on the lyrics of the new song, written on a large cardboard. The themes are characterized by being surreal and having a repetitive chorus. During the performance Ignatius sings, his friend plays the guitar, David Broncano is in charge of playing the electronic drums and Grison also accompanies them on the electric guitar.

 Ins and outs

Ricardo Castella explains internal issues and anecdotes of the program, revealing some of the secrets related to the preparation of the program.

 The weather

Jorge Ponce analyzes the weather situation in a curious way using a free application for tablet.

El "girito"

Jorge Ponce goes with a magnificent stove downtown asking people what they think about controversial issues, using a flute to identify the powerful question.

 The "Bad" anthill

Jorge Ponce parodies the best known sections of "The anthill" program, another Spanish TV show broadcast on Antena 3 channel.

Occasional sections 

 "Blockbuster" Comment

Dani Rovira appears as an occasional collaborator in this section where he talks about a blockbuster and makes a humorous summary of the film. He has commented on films such as The Lord of the Rings, Independence Day and The Bodyguard.

 Theatrical performance

Antonio Resines, as a friend of the program, makes this collaboration where with the help of the program team they do a small theatrical performance. There is no intention to make a formal performance, it emphasizes the little preparation, the low budget and the comedy.

 Surprise guest

Comedian Héctor de Miguel "Quequé" brings a guest to the show without the host knowing who he is and should try to find out through questions about who he is. The list of these guests stands out for being personalities or groups of which David Broncano has made jokes. This list is made up of Cafe Quijano, Juan Muñoz de Cruz y Raya, Macaco, Dani Martín and the music group Taburete.

 Program ideas

Comedians Rober Bodegas and Alberto Casado (Pantomima Full) bring original ideas for programs to sell on Movistar +. All these ideas are presented in a parodic and ironic way and usually these programs are very similar to other existing productions.

Guests 
First season

Second season

Third season

References 

Spanish television talk shows